Yoshio Senda  (14 February 1922 –  9 September 2009) was a Canadian judoka, Member of the Order of Canada, Canada's first kudan (ninth-degree black belt) in Judo, and founder of the Lethbridge Kyodokan Judo Club.

In 1989, the University of Lethbridge awarded an honorary Doctor of Law degree (Hon. LL.D.) to Yoshio Senda. In 2004, Senda's daughter-in-law Jane Senda published a biography of her father-in-law and history of his club titled Kyodokan: the story of the Kyodokan Judo Club and the founder, Dr. Yoshio Senda.

Publications

See also
Judo in Alberta
Judo in Canada
List of Canadian judoka

References

Further reading

Canadian male judoka
Canadian sportspeople of Japanese descent
Members of the Order of Canada
People from Mission, British Columbia
1922 births
2009 deaths
Sportspeople from British Columbia